Philip Nathan Jefferson is an American economist who served as a member of the Federal Reserve Board of Governors since 2022. He was previously vice president for academic affairs, dean of the faculty, and Paul B. Freeland professor of economics at Davidson College, Centennial Professor of Economics at Swarthmore College, a research economist for the Federal Reserve, and a professor at Columbia University. President Biden nominated him to serve as a member of the Board of Governors of the Federal Reserve System in January 2022. He became the fourth Black man to sit on the Federal Reserve's Board after the Senate confirmed his nomination on May 11, 2022. He was sworn in on May 23, 2022.

Education and early life 
Jefferson was born and raised in the Kingman Park neighborhood of Washington, D.C. He attended Vassar College, spending his junior year of college at the London School of Economics and the following summer as a participant in the American Economic Association pipeline program. He completed a doctoral degree from the University of Virginia in 1990.

Career 
After completing his PhD, Jefferson worked as assistant professor at Columbia University, a visiting professor at the University of California at Berkeley, and as an economist at the Board of Governors of the Federal Reserve System. In 1997, he joined the faculty of Swarthmore College, where he taught courses on econometrics, macroeconomics, and poverty and inequality and became Centennial Professor of Economics. In 2019, he became vice president for academic affairs and dean of faculty at Davidson College.

He was the 2005 president of the National Economic Association. He has been a trustee of Vassar College since 2002, and served on the Swarthmore Borough Council from 2008 to 2012.

Nomination to Federal Reserve

On January 14, 2022, President Biden nominated Jefferson to be a member of the Federal Reserve board of governors. Hearings were held before the Senate Banking Committee on Jefferson's nomination on February 3, 2022. The committee favorably reported his nomination on March 16, 2022 by a 24-0 vote. The United States Senate confirmed his nomination by a 91-7 vote.

Selected works

 Jefferson, Philip N. Poverty: A Very Short Introduction. Oxford University Press, 2018.
 Jefferson, Philip N., ed. The Oxford handbook of the economics of poverty. Oxford University Press on Demand, 2012.
 Jefferson, Philip N., and Frederic L. Pryor. "On the geography of hate." Economics Letters 65, no. 3 (1999): 389–395.
 Jefferson, Philip N. "Does monetary policy affect relative educational unemployment rates?." American Economic Review 95, no. 2 (2005): 76–82.
 Jefferson, Philip N. "Seigniorage payments for use of the dollar: 1977–1995." Economics Letters 58, no. 2 (1998): 225–230.
 Jefferson, Philip N. "Educational attainment and the cyclical sensitivity of employment." Journal of Business & Economic Statistics 26, no. 4 (2008): 526–535.

References

21st-century African-American people
African-American economists
American economists
Columbia University faculty
Davidson College faculty
Federal Reserve economists
Federal Reserve System governors
Living people
Swarthmore College faculty
Presidents of the National Economic Association
University of Virginia alumni
Vassar College alumni
Year of birth missing (living people)